This is a list of members of the European Parliament for the United Kingdom in the 2004 to 2009 session, ordered by name.

See 2004 European Parliament election in the United Kingdom for a list ordered by constituency.

Members
This table can be sorted by constituency, party or party group: click the symbol at the top of the appropriate column.

Changes

Notes

2004
List
United Kingdom